Aurelianidae is a family of sea anemones, comprising the following genera:
Actinoporus Duchassaing, 1850
Aureliana Gosse, 1860

References 

Actiniaria
Cnidarian families